Salih Sadir Salih Al-Sadoun (born 21 August 1981) is an Iraqi former professional footballer who played as an attacking midfielder.

Previously, Sadir played with Rah Ahan and Paykan in the Persian Gulf Pro League. He also played for the Iraq national football team between 2002 and 2011. He has two younger brothers, Ayad and Qaed, both also footballers.

Club career
Sadir started his playing career with Nasour Al-Jumhuriya before joining Najaf FC where he progressed through the youth ranks under coach Zuhair Khadim. In 1999, he was promoted into the first team by Najih Hemoud and became a regular. Under coach Hemoud, Najaf FC became one of Iraq's most entertaining teams with Saleh Sadeer – and captain Falah Hassan, Abbas Wahoudi, Saeed Muhsin, Ali Hashim and Qasim Jalout.

In 2003 after the war, he moved to Al-Talaba where he made several outstanding performances in the Arab Champions League – which earned him a move to Egyptian giants Zamalek SC for next season. After playing one season with Zamalek SC, he joined Lebanon league champions Al-Ansar where he helped them to two consecutive Lebanon league titles. Sadir moved to Zakho on 14 September 2013.

On 11 February 2022, Sadir announced his retirement from football.

International career
Sadir played for the Olympic team in the qualifying rounds – his performances compensated for the absence of Nashat Akram in Iraq's midfield. Before the war, he was named one of the two best players in the 2003–04 season by an Iraqi FA panel and became a regular in Stange's Olympic squad making his debut in the 2–1 defeat to Qatar in the former Oman and Perth Glory coach's first game in charge of Iraq. Saleh Sadeer was one of Bernd Stange's favourite players when the German first arrived in Iraq. He scored an important goal in the 1–1 draw with Vietnam in Hanoi that helped Iraq to progress to the second round.

Career statistics

International
Scores and results list Iraq's goal tally first, score column indicates score after each Sadir goal.

Honours 
Ansar
 Lebanese Premier League: 2005–06, 2006–07
 Lebanese FA Cup: 2005–06, 2006–07

Ahed
 Lebanese FA Cup: 2008–09

Individual
 Lebanese Premier League Best Player: 2006–07, 2007–08, 2008–09
 Lebanese Premier League Player of the Week: 2008–09
 Lebanese Premier League Team of the Season: 2006–07, 2007–08, 2008–09
 Lebanese Premier League top scorer: 2008–09

References

External links 
 
 
 
 Salih Sadir at iraqsport.com
 Salih Sadir at aliraqi.org

1981 births
Living people
People from Najaf
Iraqi footballers
Association football midfielders
Association football forwards
Najaf FC players
Al-Talaba SC players
Zamalek SC players
Al Ansar FC players
Al Ahed FC players
Rah Ahan players
Safa SC players
Paykan F.C. players
Duhok SC players
Zakho FC players
Al-Zawraa SC players
Naft Al-Wasat SC players
Al-Mina'a SC players
Al-Quwa Al-Jawiya players
Iraqi Premier League players
Lebanese Premier League players
Persian Gulf Pro League players
Olympic footballers of Iraq
Iraq international footballers
2004 AFC Asian Cup players
Footballers at the 2004 Summer Olympics
2007 AFC Asian Cup players
2009 FIFA Confederations Cup players
AFC Asian Cup-winning players
Iraqi expatriate footballers
Iraqi expatriate sportspeople in Lebanon
Iraqi expatriate sportspeople in Iran
Expatriate footballers in Lebanon
Expatriate footballers in Iran
Lebanese Premier League top scorers